Donna Britt (July 10, 1958 – January 21, 2021) was a longtime television news anchor at WAFB in Baton Rouge. She co-anchored the station's top rated 6 PM and 10 PM news broadcasts.

As a student, she had been working for WYNK radio, and so in 1981 she decided to get a temporary job with WAFB, the local CBS affiliate. She quickly moved from weekend reporter to full-time reporter to host of morning news shows to prime time, where she anchored 9 News.

Britt was diagnosed with amyotrophic lateral sclerosis in 2017, and retired the following year. She died at her home on January 21, 2021, at age 62.

References

1958 births
2021 deaths
20th-century American journalists
21st-century American journalists
American television news anchors
American women television journalists
Neurological disease deaths in Louisiana
Deaths from motor neuron disease
Journalists from Louisiana
People from Baton Rouge, Louisiana
People from Biloxi, Mississippi
20th-century American women
21st-century American women